The 2010 Basel Summer Ice Hockey is an ice hockey tournament that was held in Basel, Switzerland between 18 and 22 August 2010. All matches were played at host EHC Basel's home St. Jakob Arena. Six teams, split into two groups of three, once again took part.

Teams participating
The list of teams that were confirmed for the tournament are as listed:

 EHC Basel Sharks (host)
 Barys Astana
 Genève-Servette HC
 HC Eaton Pardubice
 HC Slovan Bratislava
 SKA Saint Petersburg

Group stage

Key
W (regulation win) – 3 pts.
OTW (overtime/shootout win) – 2 pts.
OTL (overtime/shootout loss) – 1 pt.
L (regulation loss) – 0 pts.

Group A

All times are local (UTC+1).

Group B

All times are local (UTC+1).

Knockout stage

Key: * – final in overtime. ** – final in shootout.

Fifth-place Match

All times are local (UTC+1).

Semifinals

All times are local (UTC+1).

Third-place Match

All times are local (UTC+1).

Final

All times are local (UTC+1).

Champions

References

External links

2010–11
2010–11 in Swiss ice hockey
2010–11 in Russian ice hockey
2010–11 in Czech ice hockey